The 1963 Formula One season was the 17th season of FIA Formula One motor racing. It featured the 14th FIA World Championship of Drivers, the sixth International Cup for F1 Manufacturers  and numerous non-championship Formula One races. The World Championship commenced on 26 May, and ended on 28 December after ten races.

Season summary
Jim Clark won his first championship with seven wins to two by Graham Hill and one by John Surtees in a revised Ferrari. This record number of wins in a season was not equalled until Alain Prost won seven races in  driving a McLaren MP4/2, and it was not beaten until  when Ayrton Senna won eight races in the McLaren MP4/4 (his teammate Prost again won seven races in 1988). However, unlike 1963 which only consisted of ten races, both the 1984 and 1988 seasons consisted of 16 races giving Clark a better winning ratio (70%) than either Prost (43.75%) or Senna (50%).

The ATS venture, founded by ex-Ferrari workers, was a failure which damaged Phil Hill's Grand Prix career. It was unrelated to the late 1970s German operation which was marginally more successful.

Championship calendar

Teams and drivers
The following teams and drivers competed in the 1963 FIA World Championship. All teams competed with tyres supplied by Dunlop.

World Drivers' Championship standings

Points were awarded on a 9–6–4–3–2–1 basis at each round, with only the best six round results retained.

 Italics indicate fastest lap 
 Bold indicates pole position
‡ No points awarded as Hill's car was pushed at the start line.

International Cup for F1 Manufacturers standings

Points were awarded on a 9–6–4–3–2–1 basis at each round with only the best six round results retained. Only the best placed car from each manufacturer at each round was eligible to score points.

Bold results counted to championship totals.
‡ No points awarded as Hill's car was pushed at the start line.

Non-championship races
Other Formula One races, which did not count towards the World Championship, were also held in 1963.

Notes and references

Formula One seasons
 
Articles containing video clips